"Cathedral" is a short story written by American writer and poet Raymond Carver. It was the first story written after finishing What We Talk About When We Talk About Love. It is the title story of a collection published in 1983: Cathedral.

Recognition
The short story "Cathedral" was included in the 1982 edition of Best American Short Stories. It is the final story in Carver's collection Cathedral (1983). "Cathedral" is generally considered to be one of Carver's finest works, displaying both his expertise in crafting a minimalist story and also writing about a catharsis with such simple storylines. The author commented in an interview:

Bruce Allen of The Christian Science Monitor considered "Cathedral" to be "among the year's finest fiction," and he wrote, "The story is about learning how to imagine, and feel - and it's the best example so far of the way Raymond Carver's accomplished miniaturist art is stretching itself, exploring new territories." Samuel Coale of The Providence Journal praised the way an "unpoetic soul" is able to describe the cathedral to a blind man: "Even in such nihilistic landscapes, epiphanies are still possible, and Carver makes us feel them with a quiet, smouldering joy that only such accurate and unblurred landscapes in fiction can produce."

References

Adaptations
Short Film Based on Raymond Carver's "CATHEDRAL"

1983 short stories
American short stories
Short stories by Raymond Carver